The Milford Haven Formation is a geologic formation in Wales. It preserves fossils dating back to the Silurian period.

See also

 List of fossiliferous stratigraphic units in Wales

References
 

Geologic formations of Wales
Silurian System of Europe
Silurian Wales